Barth Stephen Cronin (June 14, 1858 in Brooklyn, Kings County, New York – February 15, 1933 in Brooklyn, New York City) was an American businessman and politician from New York.

Life
He was the son of Richard Cronin, a dock builder, and Elizabeth (Hartye) Cronin. He attended Star of the Sea Parochial School, graduated from St. Francis College, and took a course at Brown's Business School. Then he joined his father's business, and later set up his own dock-building company. On January 4, 1883, he married Margaret Magdalen Kidney (1862–1944), and they had five children.

Cronin was a member of the New York State Senate (5th D.) from 1909 to 1912, sitting in the 132nd, 133rd, 134th and 135th New York State Legislatures; and was Chairman of the Committee on Banks from 1911 to 1912.

He died on February 15, 1933, at his home at 8070 Narrows Avenue in Brooklyn, of a heart attack; and was buried at the Holy Cross Cemetery there.

Sources
 Official New York from Cleveland to Hughes by Charles Elliott Fitch (Hurd Publishing Co., New York and Buffalo, 1911, Vol. IV; pg. 366f)
 BANK PLUM FOR CRONIN in NYT on January 20, 1911
 B. S. CRONIN DEAD; EX-STATE SENATOR in NYT on February 16, 1933 (subscription required)
 BARTH S. CRONIN in the Brooklyn Daily Eagle on February 17, 1933
 FUNERAL TOMORROW in the Brooklyn Daily Eagle on February 17, 1933 (with portrait)
 Encyclopedia of American Biography (1934)

External links

1858 births
1933 deaths
Democratic Party New York (state) state senators
People from Brooklyn
St. Francis College alumni